Jules-Théophile Boucher (15 September 1847 – 26 November 1924) was a 19th-century French actor.

A student of François-Joseph Regnier at the Conservatoire, he won first prize of comedy in 1866.

Theatre

At the Comédie-Française 
 Admission in 1866
 Appointed 340th sociétaire in 1888
 Retired in 1901

L'Étourdi ou les Contretemps
La Plus Belle Fille du monde
Tabarin
Amoureuse Amitié
Les Folies amoureuses
The Barber of Seville
Le Bonhomme Jadis
Le Cercle ou la Soirée à la mode
Mercadet
Les Faux Bonshommes
Charles VII chez ses grands vassaux
Les Demoiselles de Saint-Cyr
Bataille de dames
Grosse Fortune
Les Petites Marques
Orgon
L'Étrangère
Le Tricorne enchanté
Henri III et sa cour
Tartuffe
L'Abbé Corneille
Un mariage sous Louis XV
L'École des femmes
L'Avare
L'Aventurière, Les Rantzau (à Londres)
Les Précieuses ridicules
Le Monde où l'on s'amuse
La Métromanie
Le Dépit amoureux
Mme Desroches
Le Coq de Mycille
Au printemps
Phèdre
Le Verre d'eau
La joie fait peur
Le Lion amoureux
Maurice de Saxe
Les Enfants
Les Fâcheux
Le Joueur

External links 
Base documentaire La Grange on the site of the Comédie-Française
 Les Archives du spectacle
 Archives photographiques de Nadar

Sociétaires of the Comédie-Française
19th-century French male actors
French male stage actors
People from Troyes
1847 births
1924 deaths